Cryptoblepharus rutilus is a species of lizard in the family Scincidae. It is endemic to Palau.

References

Cryptoblepharus
Reptiles of Palau
Endemic fauna of Palau
Reptiles described in 1879
Taxa named by Wilhelm Peters